The 1925 International Cross Country Championships was held in Dublin, Ireland, at the Baldoyle Racecourse on March 28, 1925.  A report on the event was given in the Glasgow Herald.

Complete results, medallists, 
 and the results of British athletes were published.

Medallists

Individual Race Results

Men's (10 mi / 16.1 km)

Team Results

Men's

Participation
An unofficial count yields the participation of 42 athletes from 5 countries.

 (6)
 (9)
 (9)
 (9)
 (9)

See also
 1925 in athletics (track and field)

References

International Cross Country Championships
International Cross Country Championships
Cross
International Cross Country Championships
International Cross Country Championships
Cross country running in Ireland
1920s in Dublin (city)
Cross
Athletics in Dublin (city)